Gabriel Martinez is a Belizean politician. He is a former Minister of Labor, Local Government and Rural Development in Belize.

References

Government ministers of Belize
Living people
Members of the Belize House of Representatives for Corozal South West
United Democratic Party (Belize) politicians
Year of birth missing (living people)